IPFire is a hardened open source Linux distribution that primarily performs as a router and a firewall; a standalone firewall system with a web-based management console for configuration.

IPFire originally started as a fork of IPCop and has been rewritten on basis of Linux From Scratch since version 2. It supports installation of add-ons to add server services, which can be extended into a SOHO server.
In April 2015, the project became a member of the Open Invention Network.

System Requirements 
The basic requirements are at least a 1 GHz CPU, 1GB of RAM, and a 4GB hard drive. Two network cards are needed to connect to an Ethernet network. DSL, LTE and Wi-Fi (WLAN) are supported, too, with corresponding hardware.

The required computing power to run IPFire depends on the area of application. Most commonly, x86 systems are being used, but ARM devices, such as Raspberry Pi or Banana Pi, are supported, too.
IPFire can be used in virtual environments (such as KVM, VMWare, XEN, Qemu, etc.).

The basic setup of IPFire happens over a guided dialogue on the console, and the further administration takes place on the web-based management interface, such as add-ons and additional features.

System Details 
The project is regularly updated by the development team to maintain the security. Developed as a stateful packet inspection (SPI) firewall.

IPFire separates the network into different segments based on their security risk which are organised in colours. Normal clients connected to the LAN are represented as green, the Internet is represented as red, an optional DMZ is represented as orange and an optional Wireless network is represented as blue. No traffic can flow between segments unless specifically permitted through a firewall rule.

IPFire's package management system, called Pakfire allows to install system updates, which keep security up to date, and additional software packages for customisation to different usage scenarios and needs. The Linux system is customised for the concrete purpose of a firewall.

The design is modular, making its functionalities extensible through plugins, but the base comes with the following features

 Stateful packet-inspection firewall based on Linux Netfilter
 Proxy server with content filter and catching-updates functions (e.g. Microsoft Windows updates, virus scanners, etc.)
 Intrusion detection system (Snort) with the option to install the Intrusion Prevention System guardian via Pakfire
Since Core Update 131 it features the intrusion prevention system "Suricata" instead of snort
 Virtual private network (VPN) with IPsec and OpenVPN
 Dynamic Host Configuration Protocol (DHCP) server
 Caching name-server (supports DNSSEC)
 Time server
 Wake-on-LAN (WOL)
 Dynamic DNS
 Quality of service (QoS)
 System monitoring functions and log analysis
 GeoIP filtering
 Captive Portal

IPFire Location 

The IPFire Project built a free Internet geolocation database published under the Creative Commons license. It is being used by The Tor Project to identify the location of Tor nodes and relays.

See also 

 Comparison of firewalls
 List of router and firewall distributions

References

External links 
 Official website
 Website of IPFire Location
 IPFire on OpenHub
 Project presentation in Linux Magazine for CeBIT Open Source 2010 (in German)

Free routing software
Gateway/routing/firewall distribution
Wireless access points
Linux distributions used in appliances
Firewall software
Routing software
Linux distributions without systemd
Linux distributions